FC Myr Hornostayivka was a professional Ukrainian football club from the village of Hornostayivka, Novotroyiske Raion (district), Kherson Oblast, just north of the Crimean peninsula.

History

The team is supported by the agricultural company "Myr" in the village. The name in the Ukrainian language means peace.

The club competed in the Ukrainian Amateur championship the Ukrainian Amateur Cup from 2008–11 as well as the 2009–10 Ukrainian League Cup.

The club submitted its license to the Professional Football League of Ukraine and was accepted into the Ukrainian Second League for the 2011–12 season.

After a promising start to the 2013–14 Ukrainian Second League the club's administration decided to withdraw from the Professional Football League of Ukraine and return to the amateur competition.

The club entered the Ukrainian Amateur championship for 2014.

Honors

 Ukrainian Amateur Champions (4th Level)
  2010

 Kherson Oblast Champions

  1997, 2005, 2006, 2007

 Kherson Oblast Cup Champions

  2006, 2007

League and cup history (Ukraine)

{|class="wikitable"
|-bgcolor="#efefef"
! Season
! Div.
! Pos.
! Pl.
! W
! D
! L
! GS
! GA
! P
!Domestic Cup
!colspan=2|Other
!Notes
|-bgcolor=SteelBlue
|align=center rowspan=2|2008
|align=center|4th (1st round)
|align=center bgcolor=silver|2
|align=center|8
|align=center|4
|align=center|2
|align=center|2
|align=center|12
|align=center|11
|align=center|14
|align=center|
|align=center|
|align=center|
|align=center|advanced to finals
|-bgcolor=SteelBlue
|align=center|4th (final round)
|align=center bgcolor=tan|3
|align=center|3
|align=center|1
|align=center|1
|align=center|1
|align=center|6
|align=center|7
|align=center|4
|align=center|
|align=center|
|align=center|
|align=center|
|-bgcolor=SteelBlue
|align=center|2009
|align=center|4th (1st round)
|align=center bgcolor=gold|1
|align=center|6
|align=center|4
|align=center|1
|align=center|1
|align=center|14
|align=center|6
|align=center|13
|align=center|
|align=center|
|align=center|
|align=center|withdrew
|-bgcolor=SteelBlue
|align=center rowspan=2|2010
|align=center|4th (1st round)
|align=center bgcolor=gold|1
|align=center|8
|align=center|6
|align=center|0
|align=center|2
|align=center|16
|align=center|8
|align=center|18
|align=center rowspan=2|
|align=center rowspan=2|UAC
|align=center rowspan=2 bgcolor=tan| finals
|align=center|advanced to finals
|-bgcolor=SteelBlue
|align=center|4th (final round)
|align=center bgcolor=gold|1
|align=center|2
|align=center|1
|align=center|1
|align=center|0
|align=center|6
|align=center|3
|align=center|4
|align=center bgcolor=gold|Won final game
|-bgcolor=SteelBlue
|align=center|2011
|align=center|4th (1st round)
|align=center bgcolor=tan|3
|align=center|10
|align=center|5
|align=center|2
|align=center|3
|align=center|17
|align=center|7
|align=center|17
|align=center|
|align=center|
|align=center|
|align=center bgcolor=lightgreen|obtained professional status during season
|-bgcolor=PowderBlue
|align=center|2011–12
|align=center|3rd "B"
|align=center|7
|align=center|26
|align=center|13
|align=center|7
|align=center|6
|align=center|36
|align=center|26
|align=center|46
|align=center| finals
|align=center|
|align=center|
|align=center|
|-bgcolor=PowderBlue
|align=center rowspan=2|2012–13
|align=center|3rd "B"
|align=center|6
|align=center|24 	
|align=center|13 	
|align=center|3 	
|align=center|8 	
|align=center|37 	
|align=center|33 	
|align=center|42
|align=center rowspan=2|Withdrew
|align=center|
|align=center|
|align=center|
|-bgcolor=PowderBlue
|align=center|3rd "2"
|align=center|6
|align=center|10 	
|align=center|1 	
|align=center|3 	
|align=center|6 	
|align=center|5
|align=center|13 	
|align=center|6
|align=center|
|align=center|
|align=center|Stage 2
|-bgcolor=PowderBlue
|align=center|2013–14
|align=center|3rd
|align=center|14
|align=center|36
|align=center|11
|align=center|4
|align=center|21
|align=center|32
|align=center|27
|align=center|37
|align=center| finals
|align=center|
|align=center|
|align=center bgcolor=pink|Withdrew
|-bgcolor=SteelBlue
|align=center|2014
|align=center|4th (1st round)
|align=center bgcolor=tan|3
|align=center|8
|align=center|3
|align=center|2
|align=center|3
|align=center|9
|align=center|9
|align=center|11
|align=center|
|align=center|UAC
|align=center bgcolor=tan| finals
|align=center|eliminated in the first round
|-bgcolor=SteelBlue
|align=center|2015
|align=center|4th (1st round)
|align=center bgcolor=tan|3
|align=center|6
|align=center|1
|align=center|3
|align=center|2
|align=center|6
|align=center|6
|align=center|6
|align=center|
|align=center|
|align=center|
|align=center bgcolor=lightgreen|obtained professional status during season
|-bgcolor=PowderBlue
|align=center|2015–16
|align=center|3rd
|align=center|11
|align=center|26 	
|align=center|8 	
|align=center|3 	
|align=center|15 	
|align=center|38 	
|align=center|47 	
|align=center|27
|align=center| finals
|align=center|
|align=center|
|align=center|
|-bgcolor=PowderBlue
|align=center|2016–17
|align=center|3rd
|align=center|9
|align=center|32 	
|align=center|13 	
|align=center|9 	
|align=center|10 	
|align=center|39 	
|align=center|31 	
|align=center|48
|align=center| finals
|align=center|
|align=center|
|align=center|
|-bgcolor=PowderBlue
|align=center|2017–18
|align=center|3rd "B"
|align=center|5
|align=center|33 	
|align=center|	14 	
|align=center|	11 	
|align=center|8 		
|align=center|47 	 	 	
|align=center|	30 		
|align=center|53
|align=center| finals
|align=center|
|align=center|
|align=center|
|-bgcolor=PowderBlue
|align=center|2018–19
|align=center|3rd "B"
|align=center|5
|align=center|27
|align=center|14	 	
|align=center|3		
|align=center|10
|align=center|41	 	 	
|align=center|30	
|align=center|45
|align=center| finals
|align=center|
|align=center|
|align=center bgcolor=lightgrey|withdrew
|}

Coaches
 1996–2016: Oleksandr Sapelnyak
 2016–2017: Viktor Bohatyr
 2017–2019: Oleksandr Sapelnyak

References

 
Defunct football clubs in Kherson Oblast
Association football clubs established in 1994
Association football clubs disestablished in 2019
1994 establishments in Ukraine
2019 disestablishments in Ukraine